The Big Circle Gang is a Chinese triad which was established in Hong Kong in the 1970s. They were given the moniker "Big Circle Gang" and were formed by former members of the Red Guards, a paramilitary organization established by Mao Zedong during the Cultural Revolution. After Mao eventually ordered a crackdown on the Red Guards using the People's Liberation Army (PLA), many former members of the organization were imprisoned in China. However, some former Red Guards fled as refugees to Hong Kong, where they "turned their military prowess to crime", according to a Canadian court record, forming the triad known as the Big Circle Gang. The triad now thrives among the unregulated factories and underground banks of Guangdong, and especially in the city of Guangzhou; they were nicknamed the "Big Circle Gang" after a drawing on a map indicating in which part of China they operated.

They spread rapidly across Canadian cities in the 1990s, and confidential informants say Big Circle Boys are trusted bonding agents among many actors in fluid networks of Asian drug-trafficking. They controlled much of the heroin trade in central China and now control a vast percentage of the heroin and fentanyl distribution business in the United States and Canada. The Big Circle Boys are a transnational-organized crime syndicate.

On 22 January 2021, as part of Operation Kungur, Dutch police arrested Tse Chi Lop, alleged to have assumed the leadership of the organisation and having taken it to higher levels as Sam Gor (The Company), with the UN's Office on Drugs and Crime putting the larger syndicate's turnover at $8-18 billion in 2018.

References

External links

High-ranking Big Circle Boy killed in Vancouver (Global TV)
	 Raid revealed extortion gang's strength (Sydney Morning Herald)
Askmen
2 Men Charged in Chinatown Gang Death New York Times (December 30, 1995)
Woman loses deposit on US$11 million Vancouver mansion, after abandoning purchase because Big Circle Boys triad boss Raymond Huang was murdered there. Ian Young.

Triad groups
Organized crime groups in China
Organised crime groups in Hong Kong
Organized crime groups in the United States
Gangs in Asia
Chinese gangs
Gangs in Vancouver
Gangs in Toronto
Asian-American gangs
Jewel thieves
Gangs in Hawaii